Hothersall is a civil parish in Ribble Valley, Lancashire, England.  It contains two listed buildings that are recorded in the National Heritage List for England.  Both of the listed buildings are designated at Grade II, the lowest of the three grades, which is applied to "buildings of national importance and special interest".  They consist of a pair of gate piers and a house.

Buildings

References

Citations

Sources

Lists of listed buildings in Lancashire
Buildings and structures in Ribble Valley